The 2019–20 Melbourne Stars Women's season was the fifth in the team's history. Coached by David Hemp and captained by Elyse Villani, they finished on the bottom of the WBBL05 ladder. The Stars managed to win just two matches for the season, resulting in their first wooden spoon.

Squad 
Each 2019–20 squad featured 15 active players, with an allowance of up to five marquee signings including a maximum of three from overseas. Australian marquees are players who held a national women's team contract at the time of signing for their WBBL|05 team.

Notable details for the Stars squad included:

 Elyse Villani joined the team after spending four years with the Perth Scorchers
 Kristen Beams, ahead of her final season, relinquished the captaincy with Villani taking over the role
 Katie Mack did not return to the team for WBBL|05, instead she was recruited by the Adelaide Strikers
Emma Inglis, having spent the past two seasons with the Melbourne Renegades, switched back to the Stars where she began her Big Bash career
 Madeline Penna and Chloe Rafferty were added to the squad as injury replacements for Alana King and Lucy Cripps

The table below lists the Stars players and their key stats (including runs scored, batting strike rate, wickets taken, economy rate, catches and stumpings) for the season.

Ladder

Fixtures 

All times are local time

Statistics and awards 

 Most runs: Lizelle Lee – 475 (5th in the league)
 Highest score in an innings: Lizelle Lee – 103* vs Perth Scorchers, 2 November
 Most wickets: Erin Osborne – 11 (equal 21st in the league)
 Best bowling figures in an innings: Madeline Penna – 4/20 (4 overs) vs Sydney Thunder, 27 October
 Most catches (fielder): Elyse Villani – 5 (equal 14th in the league)
 Player of the Match awards: Mignon du Preez, Lizelle Lee – 1 each
 Stars Player of the Season: Lizelle Lee
 WBBL05 Young Gun Award: Annabel Sutherland (nominated)

References 

2019–20 Women's Big Bash League season by team
Melbourne Stars (WBBL)